Rafael Eduardo Costa (born 19 January 1991) is a Brazilian footballer who plays as an attacking midfielder.

Career
On July 8, 2017 Costa signed a one-year deal with Moreirense F.C. He scored on his debut against C.D. Aves on July 30, 2017. On 30 August 2021, Costa joined Najran.

References

External links

1991 births
Living people
People from Araras
Brazilian footballers
Association football midfielders
Primeira Liga players
Liga Portugal 2 players
Saudi Professional League players
Saudi First Division League players
Guaratinguetá Futebol players
Guarani FC players
Clube Atlético Bragantino players
Rio Claro Futebol Clube players
Criciúma Esporte Clube players
Paraná Clube players
Red Bull Brasil players
Paysandu Sport Club players
São Bernardo Futebol Clube players
C.D. Fátima players
Moreirense F.C. players
Boavista F.C. players
Damac FC players
Najran SC players
Brazilian expatriate footballers
Expatriate footballers in Portugal
Expatriate footballers in Saudi Arabia
Brazilian expatriate sportspeople in Portugal
Brazilian expatriate sportspeople in Saudi Arabia
Footballers from São Paulo (state)